Güzelyurt is a village in Mut district of Mersin Province, Turkey. The population of the village was 149 as of 2012. Village economy depends agriculture.

References

Villages in Mut District